David Gerber (July 25, 1923 – January 2, 2010) was a television executive producer. His notable work on television included the 1970s TV series Police Story and Police Woman. Other executive producer credits include Jessie, The Ghost & Mrs. Muir, Nanny and the Professor, Cade's County, Riker, Eischied, The Lindbergh Kidnapping Case, Nakia, Gibbsville, Hunter, Walking Tall, Quark, Today's F.B.I., Seven Brides for Seven Brothers, Lady Blue, The Price of Love and Jack & Mike.  Gerber was executive producer of the 2006 made-for-TV docudrama, Flight 93.

During his long career, he was president of the television division of three major studios: 20th Century Fox Television, from 1965 to 1972, Columbia Pictures Television, from 1974 to 1982 and MGM Television, from 1984 to 1992, throughout most of his time, his works went under his own production company David Gerber Productions. After 1992, he launched his own production company The Gerber Company. In 1993, he partnered with ITC Entertainment Group to launch a production company, the Gerber-ITC Entertainment Group. In 1995, he went to All-American Television as producer. He quit in 1998 to launch a production company affiliated with Fox Television Studios. In 2003, his contract was reupped. A graduate of the University of the Pacific, his numerous contributions to the TV industry have earned him a star on the Hollywood Walk of Fame. Until his death in 2010, he was married to actress, Laraine Stephens.

Death
David Gerber died in Los Angeles from heart failure at the age of 86, and was survived by his wife of 40 years, actress Laraine Stephens.

References

External links

David Gerber's obituary

1923 births
2010 deaths
American television producers
University of the Pacific (United States) alumni
Place of birth missing
20th Century Studios people
Columbia Pictures people
Metro-Goldwyn-Mayer executives